Idly Walpoth (24 November 1920 – 19 March 2014) was a Swiss alpine skier. She competed in two events at the 1952 Winter Olympics.

References

External links
 

1920 births
2014 deaths
Swiss female alpine skiers
Olympic alpine skiers of Switzerland
Alpine skiers at the 1952 Winter Olympics
Sportspeople from Zürich
20th-century Swiss women